Microbacterium amylolyticum is a Gram-positive, heterotrophic, aerobic, non-spore-forming and non-motile bacterium from the genus Microbacterium which has been isolated from soil from an industrial waste site in Noida in India.

References

External links
Type strain of Microbacterium amylolyticum at BacDive -  the Bacterial Diversity Metadatabase	

Bacteria described in 2012
amylolyticum